Many different means of communication have been used over the history of communications by presidents of the United States.

Direct addresses
Historically, if presidents wanted to speak to their constituents, the main way to do so was to travel cross-country and speak to the public themselves. When the first ever president, George Washington, decided to deliver his first State of the Union address, he understood the magnitude that it would have on the public’s opinion of him. Newspapers would be reporting his every word and the crowds would scrutinize his every move. Treading lightly, Washington “praised Congress” and offered “gentle suggestions.”

Radio
Warren G. Harding, the United States’ 29th president who held office from 1921 until he died in 1923, was the first president to deliver a radio address. He addressed the nation at the dedication of the Lincoln Memorial on May 30, 1922, an address that served as the day’s equivalent of the State of the Union address. The radio address “heralded a revolutionary shift in how presidents addressed the American public.”

Harding's immediate successor, Calvin Coolidge, was the next president to address the nation via radio. On December 5, 1923, The New York Times wrote that “the voice of President Coolidge, addressing Congress tomorrow, will be carried [by radio] over a greater portion of the United States and will be heard by more people than the voice of any man in history.” He spoke in Washington, D.C., and the address could be heard on radio stations in Washington, New York, Dallas, Providence, St. Louis, and Kansas City. The address was considered a significant achievement, as all six stations were able to successfully broadcast Coolidge’s speech.

Among the most famous and beloved early radio addresses were Franklin D. Roosevelt’s “Fireside Chats,” which he delivered frequently during the Great Depression. His first radio address was delivered on March 12, 1933. At this point, ninety percent of American households owned at least one radio. Thus, the radio addresses were widely accessible, and Roosevelt’s style of delivery was meant to reflect the tastes of the average American. The purpose of Roosevelt’s “Fireside Chats” (a term coined by journalist Robert Trout) was to “to ease fears and to inspire confidence in his leadership.”

Roosevelt also delivered Fireside Chats during World War II in an effort to offer justifications of the United States’ decisions regarding the nation’s involvement in the conflict. The addresses were effective in building popularity for Roosevelt’s administration.

Television
Franklin Roosevelt was the first president to appear on television. In April 1939, he spoke at the New York World’s Fair over the NBC New York television station W2XBS (the forerunner of WNBC), though these remarks were only seen on a handful of television sets at the fairgrounds, at NBC headquarters at Radio City and on some of the estimated 200 television sets in private homes in the New York metropolitan area at the time.

The development and popularity of television was stalled due to the outbreak of World War II. In October 1947, nearly a decade after Roosevelt’s television appearance, Harry S. Truman delivered the first televised presidential address from the White House. In his speech, Truman called on Americans to conserve food in order to help starving Europeans who were still recovering from the war. At the time, there were only about 44,000 television sets in U.S. homes. Regardless, this speech marked the beginning of the use of television as a main method of communication between the president and the public. In 1948, Truman became the first presidential candidate to air a paid political ad on television. In 1949, Truman was sworn in for a second term and became the first president to have a nationally televised inauguration.

Dwight D. Eisenhower was the first president to embrace television wholeheartedly by admitting it into his press conferences. This provided the public with frequent general coverage of national politics and an ability to collect the information visually.

In 1960, John F. Kennedy and Richard Nixon faced off in America’s first televised presidential debate. For the first time, candidates’ appearances would affect their success. Knowing voters would watch him in the debate, Kennedy made sure he was well-rested, tan, and made up for his appearance. Nixon, on the other hand, showed up to the debate with a 102-degree fever, giving him a pale and sickly complexion. Most voters who were listening on the radio called the debate a draw. Contrastingly, voters who watched on television pronounced Kennedy the clear winner. This demonstrated the powerful impact television had and would continue to have on the relationship between the president and the public. After Kennedy, presidents and presidential candidates would continue leveraging the medium of television to communicate with the public and win their favor.

White House website
The first official White House website was created in 1994, during Bill Clinton’s administration. White House websites generally display “photographs, speeches, press releases, digital data and other public domains,” and offer public access to details on the sitting administration’s policies and initiatives. The website serves to distribute relevant information and establish a sense of government transparency. Furthermore, the website provides the public with insight into the life of the First Family.

Email
In 1994, Bill Clinton became the first president to send an email over the Internet while in office. It was sent from Clinton’s AOL email account, ClintonPz@aol.com, to Swedish prime minister Carl Bildt. Clinton famously wrote and sent this email in all capital letters, breaching the basic protocol of 'netiquette', the acceptable way of communicating on the internet. The only other email Clinton ever sent was in 1999 to astronaut and Senator John Glenn while he was in space. Though Clinton only sent two emails, his administration sent many more. "We're the first White House to communicate with huge numbers of people from all over by E-mail", Clinton said to his Committee on the Arts and the Humanities in 1994.

Email usage in the Oval Office increased when George W. Bush entered office after Clinton, and it continued to increase under Barack Obama's presidency. Barack Obama was the first president to communicate with the public via email while he was campaigning. His campaign team collected 13.5 million email addresses during the 2008 election. Voters who opted in to be on this email list received information on his platform and how to support his campaign. Once in office, Obama was the first president to use email as his main method of communication with senior staff, advisors, and close friends. He also continued using the email list from his campaign to communicate with his supporters.

Social media

Barack Obama is often referred to as the “first social-media president.” He first had a personal Twitter account, @BarackObama. However, after the 2008 election, he said that he had "never used Twitter." Instead, it was his campaign staff that ran his account. Tweets coming directly from Obama were signed "-bo." Later he transitioned over to the official @POTUS account.

When Donald Trump was elected in 2016, the Obama administration announced a “digital transition” that would take place. This transition would give the new president access to the @POTUS social media accounts. Though the previous administration’s posts would not be deleted, they would be archived in accordance with the Presidential Records Act. However, Trump decided to continue using his personal Twitter account, @realDonaldTrump instead.

Less than one hour after his inaugural speech, Trump began tweeting from his personal account. Trump's tweets included "conspiracy theories, fake information and extremist content, including material that energizes some of his base." Trump collected 88 million followers over the course of 16,000 tweets throughout his presidency. After his election loss in 2020 to Joe Biden, Trump repeatedly tweeted false claims about COVID-19 and about the "stolen" election. Twitter reviewed Trump's tweets and found them to violate their Glorification of Violence Policy. This prompted Twitter to permanently suspend his account “due to the risk of further incitement of violence.”

See also
 Social media and political communication in the United States

References

United States presidential history
Political communication